Arduino Bertoldo (December 30, 1932 – April 3, 2012) was the Roman Catholic bishop of the Roman Catholic Diocese of Foligno, Italy.

Ordained to the priesthood in 1958, Bertoldo became bishop in 1992 and retired in 2008.

Notes

 (for Chronology of Bishops)
 (for Chronology of Bishops)

Bishops of Foligno
1932 births
2012 deaths
20th-century Italian Roman Catholic bishops
21st-century Italian Roman Catholic bishops